Chandrapura is a census village in Buxar district in the Indian state of bihar. It is situated near banks of the Ganga river Nanijor.Chandrapura is a village located in Brahmpur block of Buxar district in Bihar. It has total 766 families residing. Chandrapura has population of 5259 as per government records.

Administration
Chandrapura village is administrated by Mukhiya through its Gram Panchayat, who is elected representative of village as per constitution of India and Panchyati Raj Act.

Geography
Chandrapura is a village in Brahmpur Block in Buxar District of Bihar, India. It comes under mahuar Panchayath. It belongs to Patna Division. It is located 38 km towards East from District headquarters Buxar, 96 km from State capital Patna. Chandrapura is surrounded by Shahpur Block towards East, Chougain Block towards South, Behea Block towards East, Chakki Block towards East. Dumraon, Behea, Jagdispur and Ballia are the nearby Cities to Chandrpura. This Place is in the border of the Buxar District and Bhojpur District. Bhojpur District is in the East of this place.

Industris
Chandrapura has a music company. The name of this company is Dream Films. The owner of this company is Kamal Jee Mishra. This company is the most popular company of Bhojpuri music industry.

Transportation

Rail
Raghunathpur Railway Station and Veer Kunwar Singh Dharauli Halt are the very nearby railway stations to Chandrpura. Chandapura could be reached through Dumraon and Twining Ganj Railway Station. However Ballia Railway Station is a major railway station 26 km near to Chandrpura.

Road
Brahmpur, Dumraon, Jagdispur are the nearby by towns to Chandrpura having road connectivity to Chandrpura.

Culture
Like most cities and towns of the country, Chandrapura has a varied cultural diversity, owing to the various linguistic and cultural groups. Different festivals like Durga Puja, Diwali, Holi, Chhath Puja, as well as some native festivals.

Education

Colleges
 M.C. College, Chausa (Gola)
 Dandi Swami Sahjananad College, simri
 D.K.M. College, Dumri
 D.S.S.V. College Simari, Buxar
 L.B.T. College, Buxar

Schools
 Middle School, Chandrapura, Buxar, Bihar
 M.D.A.V Public School, Chandrapura, Buxar, Bihar
 Upgrade High School Mahuar, Buxar, Bihar
 Ganpati chakni high school, Chakni village, Buxar
 Middle School, Garhatha khurd, Brahampur, Buxar
 Primary School, Nimej, Brahampur, Buxar
 Girls Middle School, Nimej, Brahampur, Buxar
 Girls Primary School, Bagen, Brahampur, Buxar

References

External links
Villages in Buxar, Bihar

Villages in Buxar district